Thomas Fleischer (born 20 February 1971) is a German racing cyclist. He rode in the 1996 Tour de France.

References

External links
 

1971 births
Living people
German male cyclists
Place of birth missing (living people)
People from Lörrach
Sportspeople from Freiburg (region)
Cyclists from Baden-Württemberg